Tomoaki Hayama is a Japanese mixed martial artist.

Mixed martial arts record

|-
| Loss
| align=center| 2-3
| Isao Tanimura
| Decision (majority)
| Shooto: Renaxis 2
| 
| align=center| 2
| align=center| 5:00
| Tokyo, Japan
| 
|-
| Loss
| align=center| 2-2
| Ron Balicki
| Decision (unanimous)
| Shooto: Reconquista 1
| 
| align=center| 3
| align=center| 3:00
| Tokyo, Japan
| 
|-
| Loss
| align=center| 2-1
| Alex Cook
| Technical Submission (arm-triangle choke)
| VTJ 1996: Vale Tudo Japan 1996
| 
| align=center| 2
| align=center| 6:23
| Urayasu, Chiba, Japan
| 
|-
| Win
| align=center| 2-0
| Yuji Fujita
| Submission (rear naked choke)
| Shooto: Vale Tudo Junction 3
| 
| align=center| 2
| align=center| 2:25
| Tokyo, Japan
| 
|-
| Win
| align=center| 1-0
| Isamu Osugi
| Submission (guillotine choke)
| Shooto: Tokyo Free Fight
| 
| align=center| 2
| align=center| 2:10
| Tokyo, Japan
|

See also
List of male mixed martial artists

References

External links
 
 Tomoaki Hayama at mixedmartialarts.com

Japanese male mixed martial artists
Mixed martial artists utilizing karate
Mixed martial artists utilizing Kenpo
Japanese male karateka
Living people
Year of birth missing (living people)